The Topeka Scarecrows were a professional ice hockey team located in Topeka, Kansas, playing their home games at Landon Arena. The team was a member of the Central Hockey League from their founding in 1998 until 2001 when there franchise was terminated by the league midseason.

After the professional team disband, the ownership group would then start a new junior hockey team with the same name in the Tier I Junior A United States Hockey League playing from 2001 to 2003. The team was sold and then moved to St. Louis, Missouri and became the St. Louis Heartland Eagles.

Facts
Founded: 1998–1999 season
Arena: Landon Arena (capacity 7,777)
Uniform colors: black, red, and yellow
Local Media: Topeka Capital-Journal

History/Milestones

 November 13, 1997: CHL commits itself to the goal of having a franchise in Topeka for the 1998–1999 season. Co-founders Arnold Diamond and Ed Levy begin team development beginning in 1996 and making way for team and league expansion.
 February 23, 1998: Shawnee County commissioners sign a contract with Flying Cross Check, L.C.C., the company that will own and operate the CHL expansion team. The five-year pact has options for two three-year extensions.
 April 30, 1998: The Topeka ScareCrows unveil their nickname and logo.
 June 10, 1998: Construction begins on the ice installation at Landon Arena (seating capacity 7,779).
 July 20, 1998: Installation of Landon Arena ice equipment is finished.
 August 6, 1998: The Topeka ScareCrows pick their first 10 players in the Central Hockey League expansion draft, then execute the franchise's first trade to secure the rights to left wing Doug Lawrence, a six-year veteran who, should he sign, would come to Topeka from the Tulsa Oilers.
 September 1, 1998: Haywire, the mascot for the Topeka Scarecrows is born.
 October 16, 1998: The CHL Topeka Scarecrows play their first game ever in a sold out Landon Arena (capacity 7,777), a 7–3 loss to the Wichita Thunder.
 November 6, 1998: The CHL Topeka Scarecrows win their first game, a 4–3 triumph over the San Antonio Iguanas at Landon Arena.
 November 20, 1998: The CHL Topeka Scarecrows earn their first shootout win, 4–3, in a game against the Wichita Thunder in the Kansas Coliseum (seating capacity 9,600).
 December 20, 1998: The CHL Topeka Scarecrows beat the San Antonio Iguanas 5–4 to end an eight-game losing streak.
 January 19, 1999: Brett Seguin is the first Topeka Scarecrow to play in CHL All-Star game.
 February 3, 1999: Rod Branch records the first shutout in CHL Topeka Scarecrows history.
 March 18, 1999: Brett Seguin records the first hat trick in CHL Topeka Scarecrows history, against the Wichita Thunder in a 4–0 win.
 April 10, 1999: The Topeka ScareCrows end their season after losing in the first round of their first-ever Central Hockey League playoff appearance after three one-sided games against the Oklahoma City Blazers. Before going three-and-out in the playoffs, the ScareCrows finished the last half of the season with a winning record. Topeka was 18–16–1 from January through the end of the regular season after posting a 10–22–3 mark from October through December. They finished with a 28–38–4 record and averaged 4,793 fans a game.
 October 15, 1999: The Topeka ScareCrows begin their second season in a 3–1 loss against the San Antonio Iguanas, in front of a Landon Arena crowd of 7,156.
 January 25, 2000: Brett Seguin, John Vary and Bill Monkman are selected to play in the CHL all-star game.
 April 2, 2000: The Topeka ScareCrows' second Central Hockey League season ends with a 35–27–8 record, with eight shootout losses, just three points short of making the playoffs. They finished third in attendance, averaging 4,991 fans a game.
 May 3, 2000: Topeka ScareCrows general manager Chris Presson accepts position as general manager of the United Hockey League expansion club in New Haven (the New Haven Hurricanes). He is replaced by ScareCrows former assistant general manager Doug Miller.
 October 13, 2000: The CHL Topeka Scarecrows begin their third and final season at home against the Wichita Thunder 3–2 in a shootout at Landon Arena in front of 4,789 fans.
 February 20, 2001: The CHL's board of governors decides to terminate the Topeka Scarecrows season with 21 games remaining—10 of which were scheduled for Landon Arena. Saying that the ScareCrows and the Border City Bandits, of Texarkana, Texas, "breached multiple financial obligations under their sanction agreements with the CHL," the Indianapolis-based league terminated the participation of both franchises for the remainder of the 2001 season.
 February 22, 2001: The Topeka ScareCrows returned to the ice in Tulsa, Oklahoma, ending a 13-day layoff that included three days in limbo following their suspension Tuesday from the Central Hockey League, with the help of a temporary restraining order issued in Shawnee County District Court on February 16, 2001, that blocked the league from ending the ScareCrows' season.
 March 8, 2001: U.S. District Judge Sam Crow filed an 18-page ruling in which he denies the Central Hockey League's request to lift a temporary restraining order keeping the ScareCrows on the ice.
 March 29, 2001: The ScareCrows' end their third and final home season at Landon Arena with a 4–1 loss to the Wichita Thunder.
 April 10, 2001: The CHL ScareCrows end the franchise's three-year history as a minor-league professional program by ending their best-of-five Central Hockey League playoff series in a 5–3 loss to San Antonio in front of 2,121 fans. The Iguanas' victory, which the visitors claimed with a three-goal third period that wiped out a 3–2 deficit, gave San Antonio a 3–1 series victory and advanced the Texans to the Western Conference finals against Oklahoma City.

Season-by-season records
Note: GP = Games played, W = Wins, L = Losses, OTL = Overtime Losses, Pts = Points, GF = Goals for, GA = Goals against, PIM = Penalties in minutes

All-Time Roster

References 

Defunct Central Hockey League teams
Sports in Topeka, Kansas
Defunct ice hockey teams in the United States
Ice hockey clubs established in 1998
Sports clubs disestablished in 2001
Ice hockey teams in Kansas
1998 establishments in Kansas
2001 disestablishments in Kansas